Satu Vänskä (born 1979) is a Finnish Australian violinist.

Early life
Vänskä was born to a Finnish family in the Kinki region of Japan, where she took her first violin lessons at the age of three. Her family moved back to Finland in 1989 and she continued her studies with Pertti Sutinen at the Lahti Conservatorium and the Sibelius Academy. At the age of 11 Vänskä was selected for the Kuhmo Violin School in Finland, a special institution for talented young violinists where she attended master classes with Ilya Grubert, Zinaida Gilels and Pavel Vernikov and had the opportunity to perform at the Kuhmo Chamber Music Festival with the Kuhmo Virtuosi Chamber Orchestra.

In her teens Vänskä studied violin at Hochschule für Musik in Munich, Germany. This led to her performances with the Munich Philharmonic, the Bavarian Radio Symphony Orchestra, at the Tuusulanjärvi Festival, and at Festivo Aschau. From 1997 Vänskä was a pupil of Ana Chumachenco at the Hochschule für Musik in Munich where she finished her diploma in 2001.

Vänskä has received high acclaim for her violin excellence, most notably the Young Soloist of the Year (1998) award by Sinfonia Lahti.

Career
In early 2009 Vänskä helped launch the Sydney Conservatorium of Music's Sensational Sundays concert series, playing Beethoven's Kreutzer Sonata.

Vänskä is currently assistant leader of the Australian Chamber Orchestra, travelling nationally and internationally with her Tommaso Balestrieri violin. In 2011, she became the custodian of the only Stradivarius violin in Australia.

Personal life
Vänskä is married to violinist and artistic director of the Australian Chamber Orchestra, Richard Tognetti.

References

External links
Profile, Australian Chamber Orchestra

Living people
Finnish classical violinists
Finnish emigrants to Australia
Australian classical violinists
1979 births
21st-century classical violinists
Women classical violinists